Archbishop Smith may refer to:

James Smith (archbishop of St Andrews and Edinburgh) (1841–1928)
Peter Smith (bishop) (1943–2020), Archbishop of the Archdiocese of Southwark
William Smith (bishop) (1819–1892), Archbishop of the Archdiocese of St. Andrews and Edinburgh

See also
Bishop Smith (disambiguation)